Epermenia bicornis is a moth in the family Epermeniidae. It was described by Reinhard Gaedike in 2004. It is found in South Africa.

References

Epermeniidae
Moths described in 2004
Moths of Africa
Lepidoptera of South Africa